General elections were held in Senegal on 28 February 1988 to elect a President and National Assembly. Incumbent President Abdou Diouf defeated three other candidates in the presidential election, whilst in the National Assembly election Diouf's Socialist Party won 103 of the 120 seats. Voter turnout was 57.9% in the Assembly election and 58.8 in the presidential election.

Results

President

National Assembly

References

Senegal
Elections in Senegal
1988 in Senegal
Presidential elections in Senegal